In the 19th century, several people have nominally or effectively stood out as leaders of Circassia.

History

Background 
Between 1427 and 1453, Inal the Great conquered all Circassian principalities and declared himself the Grand Prince of Circassia. Following his death, Circassia was divided again.

The influential tribes of Circassia regularly met to elect a Grand Prince (Пщышхо) among them, with the only condition being that the prince can trace descent from Inal the Great. The existence of such an institute is confirmed by foreign sources. In the eyes of foreign observers, the Grand Prince was considered the king of the Circassians. However, the individual tribes were greatly autonomous and the title was mostly symbolic. In 1237, the Dominican monks Richard and Julian, as part of the Hungarian embassy, visited Circassia and the main city of this country Matrega, located on the Taman Peninsula. In Matrega, the embassy received a good reception from the Grand Prince.

In the 14th and 15th centuries Italian documents concerning the relationship between the consul of Kafa and Circassia clearly indicate the absolutely special status of the ruler of Circassia. This status allowed the senior prince of Circassia to correspond with the Pope. The letter of Pope John XXII , addressed to the Grand Prince of Zichia (Circassia) Verzacht, dates back to 1333, in which the Roman pontiff thanked the ruler for his diligence in introducing the Catholic faith among his subjects. Verzacht's power status was so high that following his example some other Circassian princes adopted Catholicism.

Confederation 
Circassia traditionally consisted of more than a dozen principalities. Some of these principalities were divided into large feudal estates, characterized by the stability of political status. Within these territories there were numerous feudal possessions of princes (pshi). The Circassian state was a federal state consisting of four levels of government: Village council (чылэ хасэ, made up of village elders and nobles), district council (made up of representatives from 7 neighboring village councils), regional council (шъолъыр хасэ, made up from neighboring district councils), people's council (лъэпкъ зэфэс, where every council had a representative). A central government emerged during the mid to late 1800s. Prior to that, the institute of grand prince was mostly symbolic.

In 1807, Shuwpagwe Qalawebateqo self-proclaimed himself as the leader of the Circassian confederation, and divided Circassia into 12 major regions. In 1827, Ismail Berzeg officially declared the military confederation of the Circassian tribes and by 1839 united a significant part of Circassia under his control. In 1839, the Circassians declared Bighuqal (Anapa) as their new capital and Hawduqo Mansur was declared the new leader of the Circassian Confederation. He kept this title until his death. In 1848, Muhammad Amin was the leader of Circassia. After learning that a warriorly scholar has arrived, thousands of families moved to the Abdzakh region to accept his rule. Seferbiy Zaneqo assumed power after Amin's departure, but died the next year.

In June 1860, at a congress of representatives of Circassians, a parliament was formed as the highest legislative body of Circassia. Being a political resistance council and the legislature of Circassia, the parliament was established in the capital of Sochi on June 13, 1860 and Qerandiqo Berzeg was elected as the head of the parliament and the nation.

List

References 

Circassian nobility